Elections were held in the state of Western Australia on 31 March 1962 to elect all 50 members to the Legislative Assembly. The Liberal-Country coalition government, led by Premier Sir David Brand, won a second term in office against the Labor Party, led by Opposition Leader Albert Hawke.

The election resulted in a confirmation of the status quo, with the only apparent seat changes since the 1959 election being due to the changes of affiliation of the two Independent Liberal members. Edward Oldfield, representing Mount Lawley, had joined the Labor Party during the previous term, whilst Bill Grayden, representing South Perth, had joined the Liberal Party. Both were re-elected.

Two seats changed between the Country and LCL Parties. In Avon, the sitting member James Mann (LCL) retired after 32 years in Parliament, and Harry Gayfer, one of the two Country Party candidates, succeeded him in the seat. Meanwhile, in outer-metropolitan Darling Range, LCL candidate Ken Dunn defeated the sitting Country member Ray Owen. The Labor candidate (Jack Metcalfe) narrowly won the primary vote, whilst Dunn polled one vote ahead of Owen, meaning Owen was eliminated and his votes distributed between Dunn and Metcalfe. A petition was filed and the Court of Disputed Returns ordered a fresh election for 22 July 1962, which widened the gap to 15 votes.

Results

|}

 381,805 electors were enrolled to vote at the election, but 11 seats (22% of the total) were uncontested—4 Labor seats (two more than 1959) representing 29,773 enrolled voters, 4 LCL seats (one less than 1959) representing 26,836 enrolled voters, and 3 Country seats (one less than 1959) representing 15,532 enrolled voters.

Post-election pendulum

See also
 Members of the Western Australian Legislative Assembly, 1959–1962
 Members of the Western Australian Legislative Assembly, 1962–1965
 Candidates of the 1962 Western Australian state election

References

Elections in Western Australia
1962 elections in Australia
1960s in Western Australia
March 1962 events in Australia